Pycnarmon eosalis is a moth in the family Crambidae. It was described by Viette in 1958. It is found in Madagascar.

References

Spilomelinae
Moths described in 1958
Moths of Madagascar